Pedro or Pierre Gailhard, full name Pierre Samson Gailhard, (1 August 1848 – 12 October 1918) was a French opera singer and theatre director.

Gifted with an exceptional singing bass voice, Pedro Gailhard made his debut at the Opéra-Comique in December 1867, then sang at the Opéra Garnier, as Mephisto in Faust by Charles Gounod in 1871, a role which he also sang at Covent Garden. His interprétation of Leporello in Don Giovanni by Mozart was considered remarkable, as was his portrayal of other roles, such as Osmin in Mozart's Die Entführung aus dem Serail, Kaspar in Weber's Der Freischütz, the King in Thomas' Hamlet, Pythéas in Gounod's Sapho, Saint-Bris and Nevers in Meyerbeer's Les Huguenots, and Faust in Boito's Mefistofele. 

Pedro Gailhard was the first lyric artist to be named director of the Paris Opera, which he headed from 1884 to 1891 and from 1893 to 1907. He was mentioned as such in the novel The Phantom of the Opera by Gaston Leroux.

Notes

Bibliography 
 Anne-Marie Gouiffès, Pedro Gailhard, un artiste lyrique à la direction de l'Opéra de Paris. 1884-1907, 2000, thèse, dir. D. Pistone, Université Paris Sorbonne.
 Fontaine, Gerard (2003). Visages de marbre et d'airain: La collection de bustes du Palais Garnier. Paris: Monum, Éditions du patrimoine. .
 Kutsch, K. J.; Riemens, Leo (2003). Großes Sängerlexikon (fourth edition, in German). Munich: K. G. Saur. .

External links 

 "Gailhard, Dictator of Paris Opera, Dies", The New York Times, 14 October 1918

19th-century French male opera singers
French basses
French theatre managers and producers
Directors of the Paris Opera
Musicians from Toulouse
1848 births
1918 deaths